Dr. John St. Clair Boyd (1858 - 1918) was an  Irish gynaecologist, surgeon and first president of the Belfast Gaelic League.

Life
He was born at Cultra House, Holywood, Co. Down as the  only son of John Kane Boyd, co-proprietor of the Blackstaff Mill.
Boyd, a member of the Church of Ireland, was born in Holywood, County Down and studied medicine at Queen's College,in 1886. Belfast. He worked for a time in Birmingham and returned in 1888 to Belfast to work at the Hospital for Sick Children, Queen Street, as assistant surgeon. He later became gynaecologist at the Ulster Hospital for Children and Women.

He was the first President of the Belfast Gaelic League, in 1895. He was also involved with the Dublin Pipers' Club and adjudicated at musical festivals. In the 1890s he was a member of the Belfast Naturalists' Field Club, for which he wrote a number of articles.

He married Helen Anne Cochran Macadam on 1 November 1887 at Duddingston Parish Church, Edinburgh.

References and sources

1858 births
1918 deaths
19th-century Irish people
Irish naturalists
Irish gynaecologists
People from County Down